Pitchikalapalem is a  village in Savalyapuram mandal in the Guntur district of India.

Assembly constituency: Vinukonda

Lok Sabha constituency: Narasaraopeta

References 

Neighbourhoods in Amaravati